Vladimir Torbica (born 20 September 1980) is a Serbian former professional footballer who played as a midfielder.

Club career
Born in Sombor, Torbica made his senior debuts at Mladost Apatin in 1997. He spent the following 10 seasons at the club, before moving to Zlatibor Voda in 2007. After winning the Serbian League Vojvodina in the 2007–08 campaign, the club merged with Spartak Subotica and continued to compete in the Serbian First League.

In early 2009, Torbica spent some time training with Partizan, but the transfer never happened. He eventually returned to Spartak Subotica and led the side to promotion to the Serbian SuperLiga. Subsequently, Torbica helped the club finish in fourth place in its first season in the top flight after a decade, thus earning a spot in the 2010–11 UEFA Europa League. He converted two penalties for a 2–1 home win over Dnipro Dnipropetrovsk in the first leg of the third qualifying round. However, they were eliminated after a 0–2 loss at Dnipro-Arena.

After having spent over a decade with Spartak Subotica, Torbica retired at the conclusion of the 2018–19 season.

International career
Torbica made three appearances for FR Yugoslavia at under-18 level during the team's unsuccessful qualifiers for the 1999 UEFA Under-18 Championship.

Statistics

Notes

References

External links
 
 
 

Association football midfielders
First League of Serbia and Montenegro players
FK Mladost Apatin players
FK Spartak Subotica players
Serbia and Montenegro footballers
Serbian First League players
Serbian footballers
Serbian SuperLiga players
Sportspeople from Sombor
1980 births
Living people